Curt Ludwig Hermann Beilschmidt (20 March 1886 in Magdeburg − 7 March 1962) was a German composer.

Life 
Beilschmidt studied at the Leipzig Conservatory from 1905 to 1909 and then went to Brussels. When he returned to Leipzig, he taught music theory and piano at the conservatory and was later active in the field of research at the University of Music and Theatre Leipzig (1946-1956). 

His catalogue of works comprises 141 pieces.

Beilschmidt died in Leipzig at the age of 75.

Compositions 
 Madrigalmusik für Streichquartett (op. 4), first performance 17 December 1908
 Streichquartett (op. 5)
 Cellosonate (op. 10)
 Im Maien : Sinfonietta (E-Dur) für Orchester : (op. 17)
 Tanzspiel Das Abenteuer im Walde (op. 25)
 musikalische Komödie Meister Innocenz (op. 24)
 Schäferspiel Der schlaue Amor (op. 30)
 Violinkonzert (op. 57)

Work 
 Weihnachtspastorale : Hirten- und Marienlieder ; neugefasst und für 3 Frauenstimmen mit Klavier gesetzt ; Werk 131. (1950)
 Kommt ohne Instrumente nit! : Advents- und Weihnachtslieder für Sopran- und Altblockflöte.  (circa 1950)
 Partiten für zwei Sopranblockflöten : op. 135c
 Operettenklänge : beliebte Melodien aus klassischen Operetten ; für Klavier zu 2 Händen. (1960)
 Verdi und Wagner. (1961)

References

External links 
 
 beilschmidt.de
 
 Curt Beilschmidt auf: Italian Opera
 

20th-century classical composers
20th-century German composers
1886 births
1962 deaths
Musicians from Magdeburg